Cole Hauser (born March 22, 1975) is an American actor. He is known for film roles in Higher Learning, School Ties, Dazed and Confused, Good Will Hunting, Pitch Black, Tigerland, Hart's War, Tears of the Sun, The Family that Preys, 2 Fast 2 Furious, The Cave, The Break-Up, A Good Day to Die Hard, Olympus Has Fallen, and Transcendence. He was nominated for the Independent Spirit Award for Best Supporting Male for his performance in Tigerland.

He starred as Officer Randy Willitz on the police crime drama series High Incident and Ethan Kelly on the police drama Rogue. He currently stars as Rip Wheeler on the Paramount Network western drama series Yellowstone.

Early life
Cole Hauser is the son of Cass Warner, who founded the film production company Warner Sisters, and actor Wings Hauser. His paternal grandfather was Academy Award-winning screenwriter Dwight Hauser. One of Cole's maternal great-grandfathers was film mogul Harry Warner, a founding partner of Warner Bros., and his paternal grandfather was Milton Sperling, a Hollywood screenwriter and independent film producer. Hauser's maternal grandmother, Betty Mae Warner, a painter, sculptor, political activist and gallery owner, was married to Stanley Sheinbaum, a political activist, economist, philanthropist, and a former Los Angeles Police Department commissioner. Hauser is of German and Irish descent on his father's side and Jewish on his mother's.

Hauser's parents divorced in 1977, when he was two years old. According to him, at roughly fifteen, he first met his father after the relocation-induced years of separation. His father took him in for a year and taught him about auditioning. Prior to that, his mother had moved Hauser and his half brother and sisters from Santa Barbara to Oregon to Florida and then back to Santa Barbara within a 12-year-span. At the time, he participated heavily in sports, but half-heartedly pursued school. He was admitted to the short-listed circle of talent at a talent summer camp in New England, then won the leading role of the stage play named Dark of the Moon, which earned him standing ovations for his performance. At 16 years old he decided to leave high school to try to break into acting.

Career

Hauser made his film debut in School Ties (1992), which starred many young and up-and-coming actors such as Brendan Fraser, Matt Damon, Chris O'Donnell and Ben Affleck. A role in Richard Linklater's Dazed and Confused also starring Affleck came along subsequently. In 1995, Hauser played the role of the leader of the campus neo-Nazi skinheads in the John Singleton film Higher Learning.  Hauser would later re-team with Affleck and Damon when they appeared together in Good Will Hunting (1997). In 2000 he played William J. Johns in Pitch Black and voiced the character in the prequel video game.

In 2002, he played a racist American prisoner-of-war in Hart's War with Bruce Willis and Colin Farrell. Then in 2003, he played a Navy SEAL in Tears of the Sun alongside Bruce Willis. He also appeared as a mob boss in 2 Fast 2 Furious. He has since had several leading roles in Hollywood films, including the Mel Gibson-produced Paparazzi and The Cave.

In 2007, he starred with Anthony Anderson in the FOX series K-Ville. The show was canceled after ten episodes. That same year, Hauser starred in The Stone Angel adapted from a novel by Margaret Laurence. The film played in various festival circles and had a limited release in Canadian theaters in May 2008. During that same year, Cole filmed other indie productions such as Like Dandelion Dust from a novel by Karen Kingsbury, Tyler Perry's The Family That Preys and the CBS television pilot The Tower.

He later played CIA Agent Mike Collins in A Good Day to Die Hard, Secret Service Special Agent Roma in Olympus Has Fallen, and Colonel Stevens in Transcendence.

He starred as Ethan Kelly on the police drama series Rogue and currently stars as Rip Wheeler on the Paramount Network Western drama series Yellowstone.

Personal life
Hauser's wife is former actress and photographer Cynthia Daniel, who played Elizabeth Wakefield in the TV series adaptation of Francine Pascal's novel series Sweet Valley High. Hauser and Daniel have three children: two sons (born 2004 and 2008), and one daughter (2012).

Filmography

Film

Television

Video game
 The Chronicles of Riddick: Escape from Butcher Bay (2004), as William J. Johns (voice role)

Awards and nominations

References

External links

Article from People.com

1970s births
20th-century American male actors
21st-century American male actors
American male film actors
American male television actors
American people of German descent
American people of Irish descent
American people of Polish-Jewish descent
Living people
Male actors from Santa Barbara, California
Warner family